The Industrial Worker, "the voice of revolutionary industrial unionism", is the magazine of the Industrial Workers of the World (IWW). It is currently released quarterly. The publication is printed and edited by union labor, and is frequently distributed at radical bookstores, demonstrations, strikes and labor rallies. It covers industrial conditions, strikes, workplace organizing experiences, and features on labor history. It used to be released as a newspaper.

The newspaper was first printed in journal format in Joliet, Illinois, beginning in January 1906, incorporating The Voice of Labor, the newspaper from the former American Labor Union which had joined the IWW, and International Metal Worker. It was edited by A. S. Edwards, and early contributors include Eugene V. Debs, Jack London, Daniel DeLeon, Bill Haywood, and James H. Walsh, along with poetry by Covington Hall. When the group led by ousted President Charles O. Sherman retained physical control over the paper after the union's 1906 Convention, and continued publication under that name for a few months (before giving up the ghost), the IWW instead issued the Industrial Union Bulletin for several years. A.S. Edwards was elected editor of the Bulletin in 1906. 

The second series of the Industrial Worker commenced in 1909 in Spokane, Washington, and has continued to this day, with only one major interruption, during the period of 1913–1916. In the early years, it was printed weekly and mainly circulated west of the Mississippi, while the IWW's "Official Eastern Organ" was Solidarity published in New Castle, Pennsylvania, and later, Cleveland, which continued until it merged with the Industrial Worker in Chicago in the 1930s.

The Spokane paper was the birthplace of the comic strip character Mr. Block, later commemorated in a Joe Hill song. The Industrial Worker usually ran four pages, with an annual eight page May Day issue reflecting on gains of the labor movement in the previous year. Circulation fell off due to the repression of the IWW during and after the First World War, reflecting a decline in the influence of radical unionism more generally.

The position of IW editor is decided every two years via IWW referendum. Recent editors have included Jon Bekken, Peter Moore, Diane Krauthamer, and Roberta McNair. Currently, the publication is edited by a committee. IWW members and working class folks are encouraged to submit articles for publication.

Issues of the Industrial Worker are often available on microfilm at university libraries and other research oriented facilities, and they contain a wealth of information on world view of the wobblies over the past century.

See also

 Fred W. Thompson, longtime Wobbly and IW editor
 Solidarity

References

External links
 
 A detailed study of the Industrial Worker from 1909-1930, including images from The Labor Press Project
 IWW Newspapers 1906-1946 (maps) Maps of newspapers affiliated with the IWW, with information about language, founding period, and duration.

Industrial Workers of the World publications
National newspapers published in the United States
Magazines established in 1906
1906 establishments in Illinois